Professor Hossein Sadri is an Iranian Azerbaijani, and Turkish scholar, architect, urban designer and activist. He is currently working as a senior lecturer in the School of Art & Design at Coventry University. Between 2010 and 2021, he worked as a full professor of architecture and urban design at Girne American University where he held the position of the dean of the Faculty of Architecture, Design & Fine Arts between 2012-2016. He held also academic teaching and research positions at Islamic Azad University of Tabriz in IRAN (2003-2005), National Academy of Sciences in AZERBAIJAN (2006), The American University in Canterbury - UK (2011), and The City University of New York in the USA (2018). He studied undergraduate and graduate courses in the departments of Architecture, Philosophy, and Environmental Sciences and Policy at Islamic Azad University of Tabriz in IRAN (1997-2005), Gazi University (2006-2010), Hacettepe University (2007), and Yildiz Technical University (2007) in TURKEY, and Central European University in HUNGARY (2007 & 2008). His Ph.D. dissertation entitled Architecture and Human Rights was an interdisciplinary studies on the spatiality of human rights. He is one of the founding members of AUMME  (Architecture and Urbanism in the Mediterranean and the Middle East), the regional academic and professional network in the field of architecture and the chair of its 2nd conference in 2014. As the chair of the second CAUMME-Contemporary Architecture and Urbanism in the Mediterranean and the Middle-East International Conference, he opened up discussions regarding the end of the era of professionalism in architecture by introducing the term “Post-Professionalism”. He co-edited Cities without Capitalism, foreword by Peter Marcuse and published by Routledge in 2022.

As a human rights activist he is the member of Amnesty International and since 2006 he worked respectively as Ankara Coordinator, National Coordinator of Urgent Action in Turkey, National Coordinator of Counter Terror with Justice Campaign, Coordinator of Istanbul, EU Contact Person of Amnesty International Turkey, Member of International Relations Group and National Coordinator of Human Rights Education in Turkey.

Books
 Cities without Capitalism, Collaboratively with Senem Zeybekoğlu, Routledge, 2021
 Neo-Liberalism and the Architecture of the Post Professional Era, Springer, 2018, 
 Architectural and Urban Research, Education, and Practice in the Era of "post-professionalism", Girne American University, 2014.
 Architecture, City and Human Rights, Collaboratively with Senem Zeybekoğlu, Centre for Habitat Studies, 2018, 
 Miniatecture: Transition Town Design, Collaboratively with Senem Zeybekoğlu, Centre for Habitat Studies, 2018, 
 Mimarlık, Mekan - Kent, Kentsel Dönüşüm ve İnsan Hakları, Collaboratively with Senem Zeybekoğlu Sadri, Antalya Chamber of Architects Publication, 2013, 
 “Kent Hakkından Kentte İnsan Haklarına" (From the Right to the City to Human Rights in the City), chapter in the book entitled “Kentsel Dönüşüm ve İnsan Hakları”,Istanbul Bilgi University Publications, 2013,

Selected publications
 Urbanization as Taxidermy: 'Man'hattanization of Mannahatta 
 Miniature as a way of representation in design studio: a case study,
 De-Urbanization and the Right to the De-Urbanized City,
 Urbanization: Planting Forests in Pots 
 Urban Cages and Domesticated Humans  
 Profession vs Ethics 
 "Özgürleştirici Mimarlık Eğitimi" (Liberating Architectural Education), Journal of Critical Pedagogy, 2013
 “Etik Bir Sorun Olarak Mimarlar İş-Galindeki Mimarlik" (Architecture Under the Occupation of Architects as an Ethical Problem), Serbest Mimar Journal, 2013
 “Professional Ethics in Architecture and Responsibilities of Architects towards Humanity”, Turkish Journal of Business Ethics, 2012
 “Mimarlık ve İnsan Hakları” (Architecture and Human Rights), Mimarlik Journal of Architecture, 2012
 “Şark Şehrinin Uyanışı: Nakş-I Cihan Meydanının İnşası ve Şehircilikte İfahan Okulu” (Revival of an Eastern City: Construction of Naqsh-e Jahan Square and Isfahan School of Urbanism), Mimarlik Journal of Architecture,2011
 “Mekan ve İnsan Hakları” (Space and Human Rights), 2011
 “Kadınların Kent Hakkı” (Women's Right to the City), 2011

Awards
 - First Prize and Letter of Honor in Study and Research, Ministry of Education (Iran), 1994
 - First Prize and Letter of Appreciation in Study and Research, Ministry of Education (Iran), 1996
 - First Prize and Letter of Appreciation in Study and Research, Ministry of Education (Iran), 1997
 - Ph.D. Fellowship, The Scientific and Technological Research Council of Turkey - TUBITAK, 2006-2010
 - Workshop Scholarship, Dignity International, 2007
 - Summer School Fellowship, Central European University, 2007
 - Conference Grant, European Science Foundation, 2008
 - Summer School Fellowship, UNDP Regional Office and Central European University, 2008

References

Academic staff of Girne American University
Academic staff of the Islamic Azad University
Iranian architects
1979 births
Living people
Architecture academics
Architectural theoreticians
Climate activists
Academics of Coventry University
The Futurist people
Iranian non-fiction writers